The Roman Catholic Diocese of Mocoa–Sibundoy is a diocese located in the cities of Mocoa and Sibundoy in the Ecclesiastical province of Florencia in Colombia.

History
8 February 1951: Established as Apostolic Vicariate of Sibundoy from the Apostolic Vicariate of Caquetá
29 October 1999: Promoted as Diocese of Mocoa – Sibundoy
13 July 2019: Changed province from Popayán to Florencia

Ordinaries
 Vicars Apostolic of Sibundoy (Roman rite) 
Camilo Plácido Crous y Salichs, O.F.M. Cap. (1951.02.08 – 1971.01.16)
Ramón Mantilla Duarte, C.Ss.R. (1971.01.16 – 1977.04.26), appointed Bishop of Garzón
Rafael Arcadio Bernal Supelano, C.Ss.R. (1978.02.27 – 1990.03.29), appointed Bishop of Arauca
Fabio de Jesús Morales Grisales, C.Ss.R. (1991.04.15 – 1999.10.29)
 Bishops of Mocoa–Sibundoy (Roman rite)
Fabio de Jesús Morales Grisales, C.Ss.R. (1999.10.29 – 2003.10.18)
Luis Alberto Parra Mora (2003.10.18 – 2014.12.01)
Luis Albeiro Maldonado Monsalve (2015.10.15 – present)

See also
Roman Catholicism in Colombia

Sources

External links
 GCatholic.org

Roman Catholic dioceses in Colombia
Roman Catholic Ecclesiastical Province of Florencia
Christian organizations established in 1951
Roman Catholic dioceses and prelatures established in the 20th century
1951 establishments in Colombia